Gujarati kadhi is a Gujarati version of kadhi. It is a very popular Gujarati dish made from buttermilk or dahi (yogurt) and gram flour. Kadhi is an essential part of Gujarati cuisine.

Popularity
When Barack Obama visited India he was served Gujarati kadhi. Kadhi was included on the Chinese president's menu when he visited Ahmadabad. Kadhi has different varieties in India, due to which Gujarati kadhi is completely different from Sindhi Kadhi, Rajasthani Kadhi, Bohri Kadhi or a UP Kadhi except that all are yoghurt based (except sindhi kadhi which has a tamarind base). In Gujarat it's served with khichdi or steamed rice.

Preparation
Gujarati Kadhi is lighter when compared to Punjabi Kadhi. The curd and gram flour is turned into a liquid mixture by mixing with few cups of water. The chopped green chilies, chopped ginger and asafoetida are fried in a pan in medium flame. After that the curd paste is mixed and heated for few minutes and stirred. Served hot with Khichdi, naan, chapati or rice.

Ingredients
Dahi (yogurt), gram flour, asafoetida, cinnamon powder, mustard seeds, curry leaves, coriander leaves.

Variations

Punjabi Kadhi, Sindhi Kadhi, Rajasthani Kadhi, Kathiawadi kadhi.

References

Further reading

Indian cuisine
Gujarati cuisine